Bernd Hahn (born 16 November 1954 in Elbingerode) is an East German luger who competed from the early 1970s to the early 1980s. He won two gold medals in the men's doubles event at the FIL World Luge Championships (1974, 1981).

Hahn also won four medals in the men's doubles event at the FIL European Luge Championships with three silvers (1973, 1978, 1980) and one bronze (1975)

Competing in two Winter Olympics, he earned his best finish of fourth in the men's doubles event at Lake Placid, New York in 1980.

After retiring from luge, Hahn worked as a luge coach for Canada, France, and (since 2006) Russia

References
2002 information on Hahn as a coach.
2006 information on Hahn leaving the French luge team for Russia. 
Hickok sports information on World champions in luge and skeleton.
List of European luge champions 

Wallenchinsky, David. (1984). "Luge: Men's Two-seater". In The Complete Book the Olympics: 1896-1980. New York: Penguin Books. p. 576.

External links

1954 births
German male lugers
Living people
Lugers at the 1976 Winter Olympics
Lugers at the 1980 Winter Olympics
Olympic lugers of East Germany
People from the Harz
20th-century German people